During the 2004–05 German football season, 1. FC Kaiserslautern competed in the Bundesliga.

Season summary
Kaiserslautern rose to 12th in the final table. The highlight of the season was undoubtedly the team's 15–0 victory at fifth-tier FC Schönberg 95, which saw striker Carsten Jancker break the German record for the most goals scored in a DFB-Pokal match. However, manager Kurt Jara quit before the end of the season, citing irreconcilable differences with the club management. After a brief caretaker spell under 1. FC Kaiserslautern Amateure manager Hans-Werner Moser, the club turned to Michael Henke, former assistant coach of Bayern Munich, as his permanent successor.

Players

First-team squad
Squad at end of season

Left club during season

Competitions

Bundesliga

League table

References

Notes

1. FC Kaiserslautern seasons
German football clubs 2004–05 season